Ramón Magariños Duro (born 16 February 1948) is a Spanish sprinter. He competed in the men's 400 metres at the 1968 Summer Olympics.

References

1948 births
Living people
Athletes (track and field) at the 1968 Summer Olympics
Spanish male sprinters
Olympic athletes of Spain
Sportspeople from the Province of Pontevedra